The Estonian Association of Gerontology and Geriatrics (EGGA) (Estonian: Eesti Gerontoloogia ja Geriaatria Assotsiatsioon) is an association of Estonian professionals who work with the elderly, established in 1997.

Activities

As of 2005 the association had 154 members.  These included doctors, nurses and paid or volunteer care givers, 
managers of institutions that care for the elderly and academics.  
It undertakes professional training, development of geriatric care guidelines and standards, research and preparation of educational and informational material. 
The Association contributed to a 2010 study undertaken by the OECD to examine improvements to public service delivery and performance through a single government approach.

The Association is a member of the International Association of Gerontology (IAG) and the European Union Geriatric Medicine Society (EUGMS).  
As of 2004 the Association was a member of CARMA - Care for the Aged at Risk of Marginalization - a European social policy research project.
EGGA is associated with Abuel, which conducts research on abuse of the elderly for use in policy formulation by government agencies in Europe.
It is also associated with the Academic Network of European Disability Experts.

Board

As of 2012 the board had the following members:
Jelena Leibur, M.D. (Chairman of the Board), chairman, Tallinn Diaconal Hospital of EELC
Kai Saks, M.D., Ph.D., associate professor, University of Tartu, Department of Internal Medicine
Helgi Kolk, M.D., Ph.D, Researcher, Tartu University Hospital, Department of Internal Medicine
Riin Tamm, M.Sc., Ph.D. student, researcher, Institute of Molecular and Cell Biology and Estonian Genome Center of University of Tartu
Miia Sultsmann, M.D., Chairman of the board, Räpina Hospital
Maarika Tisler, MSW, social worker, Tartu University Hospital, Sports Medicine and Rehabilitation Clinic
Arge Leht, home care nurse and consultant, Keila Social Centre

Citations and references

Cited sources

External links
 

Medical and health organizations based in Estonia
1997 establishments in Estonia